, a Gato-class submarine, was the first ship of the United States Navy to be named for the haddo.

Construction and commissioning
Haddo′s keel was laid down by the Electric Boat Company at Groton, Connecticut. She was launched on 21 June 1942, sponsored by Mrs. Charles F. Russell, and commissioned on 9 October 1942. in command.

Atlantic war patrols, April – July 1943
After conducting shakedown off New England, Haddo departed New London 9 April 1943 to patrol the shipping lanes to Rosneath, Scotland. She arrived 30 April and joined Submarine Squadron 50 (Subron 50), which was assigned to patrol off Norway and Iceland and stand ready in case of a breakthrough of the German fleet from Norway. When it became clear after three patrols that targets were scarce in this region, Haddo and her sister submarines were sent back to the United States.

Fourth–sixth war patrols, November 1943 – July 1944
Haddo returned to New London 29 July 1943 and steamed via the Panama Canal to Mare Island, Calif. Assigned to the Pacific Fleet, she reached Pearl Harbor 25 November and put to sea 14 December on her fourth war patrol, in Philippine waters. The submarine made few contacts and terminated the patrol at Fremantle, Australia, 4 February 1944.

Sailing from Fremantle 29 February, Haddo embarked on her fifth war patrol in waters off Borneo, Java, and Indochina. After a disappointing attack 8 March in which two torpedoes exploded prematurely, she made an attack on a tanker and escort 14 March which produced unconfirmed results. Moving to the Indochina coast, she sank a small craft with gunfire the night of 23 March and damaged freighter Nichian Maru 29 March before returning to Fremantle 22 April 1944.

Haddo departed Fremantle 18 May 1944 to conduct her sixth war patrol in the East Indies. After suffering an air attack off Morotai 30 May, she sighted heavy smoke and proceeded to investigate. The smoke was a lure that concealed a Japanese patrol boat. After evading this one, Haddo encountered six more of the smoking lures. Haddo sank two small craft 11 June and scouted the Tawi Tawi anchorage on 14 June. Shortly thereafter she was detected by a patrol airplane and pursued for almost 10 days. Her sixth war patrol was terminated 16 July at Fremantle.

Seventh war patrol, August – October 1944
For her seventh war patrol Haddo joined a coordinated attack group with five other submarines to cruise Philippine waters. Japanese convoys ventured into the Palawan area with strong air cover during the day, but usually anchored with escort protection for the night.

Learning from  that a convoy had been attacked by  4 days before and trailed to Paluan Bay, the submarines closed for the attack. As the convoy headed out to sea before daylight 21 August, Ray sank one transport while the escort vessels pursued Harder. At this point Haddo entered the fray, launched six torpedoes at three targets, and dived to avoid air attack. Over one hundred depth charges churned the sea, but Haddo had already sunk cargo ships Kinryu Maru and Norfolk Maru.

Next day Haddo followed Harder in for an attack on a small convoy with escorts, and Haddo succeeded in sending escort ship Sado to the bottom. Following a lone destroyer and awaiting her opportunity. Haddo was suddenly turned upon by the Japanese ship. She launched a four-torpedo spread "down the throat" of the destroyer, which veered off and headed for Manila.

Cruising off Cape Bolinao 23 August, the submarine was about to torpedo a tanker close to shore when she detected a pursuing destroyer. With four torpedoes she ripped off the warship's bow. Haddo then maneuvered to finish off her antagonist, but her last torpedo missed. Despite the efforts of two Japanese trawlers and another destroyer, Asakaze soon sank, giving Haddo another kill.

Diverting to New Guinea to refuel and rearm, Haddo continued her seventh war patrol. She sank a sampan 8 September and 21 September found a convoy and maneuvered into position ahead of it. While turning to avoid a destroyer, Haddo lost depth control, and was not able to regain it in time to effectively attack the cargo ships. She subsequently headed for Subic Bay, and lifeguard duty, but on the way detected a hospital ship (Takasago Maru) and survey ship in company. Disregarding the former, she sent the survey ship, Katsuriki, to the bottom.

On 22 September, while serving on lifeguard station in Subic Bay,"Haddo" rescued Hollis Hills, a US Navy pilot shot down by antiaircraft fire. Hills was an American who joined the Royal Canadian Air Force before the United States entered the war, after which he joined the USN. Notably, while flying an RCAF P-51 Mustang over France in 1942, he had become the first P-51 pilot to shoot down an enemy aircraft.

Haddo returned to Fremantle 3 October 1944. For this outstanding patrol the submarine received the Navy Unit Commendation.

Eighth and ninth war patrols, October 1944 – July 1945
Haddo returned to the waters off Manila for her eighth war patrol. Departing Fremantle 20 October she sank oiler Hishi Maru No. 2 on 9 November, Serving as lifeguard boat for aircraft, she was credited with sinking No.3 Kyoei Maru on 6 December 1944, (but postwar accounting showed the target was only damaged) before terminating her eighth war patrol at Pearl Harbor 27 December. From there she was sent to Mare Island shipyard for much-needed repairs, arriving 5 January 1945.

Haddo departed on her ninth war patrol 16 May 1945. Cruising the East China and Yellow Seas, she attacked a convoy emerging from the fog 1 July and quickly sank a small coastal defense vessel (Type D escort ship CD-72) and cargo ship, Taiun Maru No. 1. Clearing the area, she heard automatic gunfire, and soon saw a frigate bearing down hard upon her. Haddo'''s skipper decided not to dive and instead turned on a parallel but opposite course, and the frigate shot by with her guns blazing. Haddo suffered little damage, and was able to avoid a companion escort and finally reach deep water. That evening she sank two sailing junks and then set course for a new station off Port Arthur. She sank a trawler 3 July, survived a furious depth charge attack by patrol vessels, and proceeded to Guam arriving 16 July 1945.

Post-warHaddo departed on her 10th and last war patrol 10 August 1945 but it was soon terminated by the surrender of Japan. She then headed for Tokyo Bay, where she witnessed the signing of the surrender on board the battleship  and departed for home. Touching at Hawaii, Haddo arrived at Panama 28 September and New London 6 October 1945. Decommissioning 16 February 1946, Haddo was kept in reserve until her name was stricken from the Navy List 1 August 1958. She was sold for scrap 30 April 1959 to Luria Brothers & Co., Philadelphia, Pa.

In addition to the Navy Unit Commendation, Haddo'' received six battle stars for her World War II service. Her fifth, seventh, eighth, and ninth war patrols were designated successful.

References

Bibliography

External links
navsource.org: USS Haddo
SS255 Pictures

Gato-class submarines
World War II submarines of the United States
Ships built in Groton, Connecticut
1942 ships